The women's marathon at the 2015 World Championships in Athletics was held at the Beijing National Stadium on 30 August.

Summary
Under overcast skies  the race quickly formed two large packs of about 20 runners.  For the next 25K, the lead pack remained about the same size with some runners bridging the gap in time for others to fall off the pace.  Between 25K and 30K, the pack dropped to a dozen runners.  Just after 31K, defending champion Edna Kiplagat accelerated.  In the next 4K, the lead pack cut in half, the remaining athletes were three Kenyans, two Ethiopians and Eunice Kirwa wearing a Bahrain uniform, from Kenya.  London Marathon champion Tigist Tufa was the first to fall back, then Kiplagat began to lose contact.  But the four person pack remained tougher into the stadium.  Four athletes to sprint it out on the track for three medals after running 26 miles.  Mare Dibaba (no relation to the other famous Dibaba sisters) led the group toward the tunnel.  As they started to speed up, Jemima Sumgong did not have another gear.  Kirwa was perfectly positioned to strike but instead Helah Kiprop launched the attack from the back after looking like she was ready to drop off, long striding behind the diminutive Dibaba.  60 metres before the finish they were almost even, but Dibaba would not give that last few inches.	
Then Dibaba sped away to cross the line with almost 7 metres gap.  The times had a second between first and second, a four-second gap amongst the medalists and a 7-second gap back to fourth place.  On every count, the closest Marathon finish in World Championship history.

It was four Kenyan born athletes in places 2–5, Ethiopia and Japan placed three each in the top 14 places.

Records
Prior to the competition, the records were as follows:

Qualification standards

Schedule

Results
The race was started at 07:30.

References

Marathon
Marathons at the World Athletics Championships
2015 in women's athletics
Marathons in China
Women's marathons